Joseph Manton (4 December 1871 – 9 December 1958) was an English cricketer active from 1895 to 1904. Born at West Bromwich, Staffordshire, he was a right-handed batsman and right-arm fast bowler, making a single appearance in first-class cricket.

Educated at King Edward's School, Birmingham, where he played for the school cricket team, Manton made his debut in county cricket for Bedfordshire in the 1895 Minor Counties Championship against Wiltshire at Trowbridge. He made seven further appearances for Bedfordshire, all coming in 1895. He later played a single first-class match for Warwickshire against Surrey in the 1898 County Championship at The Oval. He took one wicket in the match, dismissing Tom Hayward, and scored 5 runs. He later played in the 1904 Minor Counties Championship for Staffordshire, making four appearances.

He died at Henham, Essex on 9 December 1958.

References

External links
Joseph Manton at ESPNcricinfo
Joseph Manton at CricketArchive

1871 births
1958 deaths
Sportspeople from West Bromwich
People educated at King Edward's School, Birmingham
English cricketers
Bedfordshire cricketers
Warwickshire cricketers
Staffordshire cricketers